Walter Karl Zinsmeister (born 1959) American journalist, researcher, and consultant. From 2006 to 2009, he served in the White House as President George W. Bush's chief domestic policy adviser, and Director of the White House Domestic Policy Council. In 2016 he created the Almanac of American Philanthropy—the definitive reference on America's use of private resources to solve public problems—and is now an adviser and national authority on the power of voluntary action and civil society to spur innovation and social refinement in the U.S.

Career
Zinsmeister is a graduate of Yale University where he studied history and was a member of Manuscript Society. He also spent time as a special student at Trinity College, Dublin, in Ireland. He won college rowing championships in both the U.S. and Ireland.

His first job in Washington was as a legislative assistant to U.S. Senator Daniel Patrick Moynihan, a New York Democrat. He was later named DeWitt Wallace Fellow, and eventually appointed to the J.B. Fuqua Chair at the American Enterprise Institute, where over three decades he researched a range of topics extending from social welfare and demographics to economics and cultural trends.

Zinsmeister's writing has been published in periodicals ranging from The Atlantic Monthly to Real Clear Politics and the New York Times to the Wall Street Journal. He has been an adviser to many research and policy groups, and has testified before Congress and Presidential commissions on topics like family policy, daycare, farm subsidies, and the Iraq war. He has made many appearances on television and radio.

He has written 13 books, including one released simultaneous with the 2016 elections on the best ways to solve future social problems, a 2015 volume on how public policy is changed by savvy donors, and a 2014 look at charter school effectiveness (with a spinoff in the Wall Street Journal). He wrote two books of Iraq War reporting, and other works on education, economics, and population trends. He also created a storytelling cookbook, and a non-fiction comic book. In late 2015 he edited a book and published a companion essay in the Wall Street Journal predicting a revival of Catholic schools.

In 2016, a major new reference book created by Zinsmeister, the Almanac of American Philanthropy, was published after three years of in-depth research. The book has been described as the authoritative reference on private giving in the U.S. It contains sections on America's greatest givers, living and dead; the major achievements of American philanthropy in nine areas (including Medicine, Education, the Arts, Religion, Overseas giving, Local projects, and so forth); an annotated list of essential readings in the field; a collection of leading quotes on philanthropy; a 22-page foldout timeline mapping important philanthropic events in the U.S. from 1636 to 2015. Zinsmeister's long introductory essay analyzes the cultural importance of philanthropy to the success of the United States. He created a Compact Edition of the Almanac of American Philanthropy in 2017.

The American Enterprise 
For a dozen years before becoming the White House Domestic Policy Adviser (1994 to 2006), Zinsmeister was editor-in-chief of The American Enterprise, a national magazine covering politics, business, and culture.

Zinsmeister was an embedded journalist during the 2003 invasion of Iraq, and then served three additional months-long embeddings with combat units during the insurgency stage of the war. He shot a documentary film about soldiers in Iraq, called "WARRIORS", which was funded by the Corporation for Public Broadcasting and nationally broadcast by PBS.

He wrote three books of Iraq reporting. Boots on the Ground: A Month with the 82nd Airborne in the Battle for Iraq, published in August 2003, was the first Iraq War book published by an embedded journalist. Dawn Over Baghdad: How the U.S. Military is Using Bullets and Ballots to Remake Iraq was one of the first portrayals of the insurgency phase of the Iraq War. Combat Zone: True Tales of G.I.s in Iraq was a rare non-fiction graphic novel from Marvel Comics.

White House employment 
During his years in the West Wing, as director of the Domestic Policy Council, Zinsmeister was involved in policy making on topics like the 2008 mortgage and student-loan credit crises, immigration reform, housing, biotechnology and stem cell policies, airport congestion, education reform, transportation issues, health policy, faith-based schooling, an 8,000-job layoff in Ohio, poverty, crime, family policy, civil rights, and veterans affairs.

Some published work produced by the White House Domestic Policy Council under Zinsmeister:
 Dole/Shalala Commission report on improving care for wounded warriors
 White House report on disadvantaged children served by faith-based urban schools
 White House report on progress in stem-cell science
 Immigration reform bill of 2007

Post-White House career 
After leaving the White House, from 2009 to 2010, Zinsmeister became an executive in his native region of upstate New York with L. & J. G. Stickley, an Arts and Crafts furniture manufacturing firm founded by Gustav Stickley. In 2011, he wrote a White House memoir. A storytelling cookbook, regional culture guide, and celebration of localism that he co-created with two of his three children, called Finger Lakes Feast, was published in 2012 and widely reviewed.

Zinsmeister returned to Washington to serve as vice president at the Philanthropy Roundtable, an association of donors, where he produced more than a dozen books, 40 magazine issues, 50 podcast episodes, and many other products. These include his 2016 illustrated book What Comes Next? How private givers can rescue America in an era of political frustration—which examines the relationship between politics and philanthropy in America, and presents a strategy for attacking national problems even if politics is gridlocked.

The Almanac of American Philanthropy, is his authoritative 1,342-page resource on the significance and history of the U.S. charitable sector. From Promising to Proven, assesses the national importance of charter schools, and Agenda Setting, is about how private donors transform American governance.

Books he has edited in recent years include two examining the country's best programs for job re-training  and helping difficult populations like the homeless, released prisoners, former addicts, and welfare recipients succeed in the workforce. Catholic School Renaissance, analyzes the revival of inner-city Catholic schools and why that is important to the nation. Serving Those Who Served is a manual for the new field of philanthropy for veterans, service members, and their families—where Zinsmeister has been a leader, growing out of his military reporting and his veterans work at the White House.

Zinsmeister has conducted in-depth research on the inventive power and importance of science philanthropy, which has powered innovations ranging from the world's greatest telescopes to medical breakthroughs like blood typing; organ transplants; vaccines for polio, yellow fever, and many other diseases; fundamental genetic discoveries; and seminal brain research; along with many other discoveries. He has uncovered much nearly unknown American philanthropic history, including essays on medical research, the importance of anonymity to private giving, even the existence of "national-security philanthropy" in the U.S.—by which donors have made crucial contributions to defense of the nation. He has analyzed who gives most to charity in the U.S., and tracked the rise of donations by Americans for overseas development work. He has catalogued the private philanthropy that was crucial to creation of the state of Israel.

His biographies of great philanthropists include profiles of Julius Rosenwald, George Eastman, Alfred Loomis, Benjamin Rush, the Tappan brothers, and Oseola McCarty.

Personal life
Zinsmeister is married and has three children. He lives on a boat in the Sea Islands of South Carolina.

References

External links 
 
  Biography at Philanthropy Roundtable
  Personal website
 Zinsmeister PBS film
  30-minute talk on philanthropy
  Biographical info from White House years
 

1959 births
American Enterprise Institute
American male journalists
George W. Bush administration personnel
Living people
New York (state) Republicans
United States presidential advisors
Washington, D.C., Republicans
Yale College alumni